Yemişli is a village located in the Midyat District of Mardin Province of Turkey. It is situated 14 km south to the town of Midyat.

Its residents consist of Assyrians and of Kurds of the Şemikan tribe (includes Yazidis) and had a population of 486 in 2021.

It is one of the larger villages of Midyat and has two well-maintained, recently renovated churches which were funded by Assyrians in Europe at a cost of 600,000 Turkish lira.

References

External links 
Article on churches being rebuilt

Assyrian communities in Turkey
Tur Abdin
Villages in Midyat District
Yazidi villages in Turkey
Kurdish settlements in Mardin Province